is a railway station in Tsu, Mie Prefecture, Japan, operated by Ise Railway. The station is 14.0 rail kilometers from the terminus of the line at Kawarada Station.

History
Ise-Ueno Station opened on March 27, 1987.

Lines
Ise Railway
Ise Line

Station layout
Ise-Ueno Station has a single side platform serving bi-directional traffic. The station is unattended.

Platforms

Adjacent stations 

|-
!colspan=5|Ise Railway

External links

 Official home page 

Railway stations in Japan opened in 1987
Railway stations in Mie Prefecture